The 1992–93 Segunda División was the 44th season of the Mexican Segunda División. The season started on 7 August 1992 and concluded on 23 May 1993. It was won by UT Neza.

In this edition the best team of the regular season qualified directly for the final of the championship.

Changes 
 Pachuca was promoted to Primera División.
 Cobras was relegated from Primera División.
 Tepatitlán was promoted from Segunda División B.
 Atlético San Francisco was promoted from Tercera División.
 Zitlaltepec was promoted from Segunda División B, however, the team was relocated to Xochitepec and renamed Marte. 
 Delfines de Abasolo was promoted from Segunda División B, however, the team did not meet the requirements to compete and its license was bought by Delfines de Acapulco, which remained in the division.
 Tecomán, UAQ and Chetumal were relegated from Segunda División.

Teams

Group stage

Group 1

Group 2

Group 3

Group 4

Results

Championship play-offs

Play-offs

(*) UT Neza advanced to the promotion final as best regular season record

Promotion final

References 

1992–93 in Mexican football
Segunda División de México seasons